This is a list of English language words derived from toponyms, followed by the place name it derives from.

General 
 agate — after Achates, ancient Greek name for the river Dirillo on the Italian island of Sicily
 Alberta clipper — a weather phenomenon named after the Canadian province of Alberta, where it originates 
 Angora goat, Angora rabbit, Angora wool (obtained from the previous two), Angora cat — named after Angora, variant or former name of Ankara, their place of origin 
 Antimacassar — after Makassar, Indonesia, which was the source of hair oil
 Armageddon — after "mount of Megiddo", where the battle was to be fought according to myth 
 badminton — after Badminton in Gloucestershire, England
 balkanization — after the Balkans, region in southeastern Europe similarly divided into small nations in the twentieth century 
 bangalored — after Bangalore, India; used often in the US when jobs are lost because of outsourcing; first time use by the magazine The Economist; usage: "He is sulking today because he got bangalored."
 Bedford cord, a heavy fabric with a ribbed weave similar to corduroy; named after either Bedford, England or possibly New Bedford, Massachusetts
 Bedlam — meaning pandemonium, after popular name/pronunciation of St Mary of Bethlehem, London's first psychiatric hospital 
 Bedlington Terrier, a breed of dog, after Bedlington, UK
 bezant — former gold coin, and current heraldic charge, after Byzantium (now Istanbul), where the coins were made
 bikini — two-piece bathing suit for women, after Bikini Atoll in the Marshall Islands, where atomic bombs were tested in 1946; supposedly analogous to the "explosive" effect on the male libido 
 the Blarney and Blarney Stone — Blarney Castle
 Boeotian, an ancient Greek term for a fool, after the Boeotian people
 bohemian — term referring to artists, writers, and other people who wished to live an unconventional, vagabond, or "gypsy" lifestyle; from Bohemia, where "gypsies" were erroneously thought to originate; see also gypsy, below
 La Brabançonne, national anthem of Belgium — Brabant, province of Belgium
 Bronx cheer — a noise made by the mouth to signify derision; after The Bronx, a borough of New York City
 brummagem — goods of shoddy quality; from a local pronunciation of Birmingham, city in the United Kingdom
 bungalow — a low building or house, from a Gujarati word meaning "Bengalese", used elliptically to mean a house built in the style of Bengal
 Byzantine, used to describe any work, law, or organization that is excessively complex or difficult to understand, named after Byzantine Empire
 calico — a type of cloth named after Calicut, where Europeans first obtained it; Calico cat and calico horse derive from the appearance of their mottled coat suggesting calico cloth
 canary — a small yellow bird, originating on and named after the Canary Islands, specifically the largest island, Gran Canaria, called in Latin Insula Canaria, "island of dogs", after the wild native dogs found there 
 Capri pants — mid-calf pants named for the Italian isle of Capri, where they rose to popularity in the late 1950s and early '60s.
 Caucasian — name for the "white race", coined by anthropologist Johann Blumenbach after Caucasus Mountains, their supposed ancestral homeland 
 chautauqua — a form of local fair, after Chautauqua, New York, where the first one was held 
 Chicago Typewriter, a nickname for the Thompson submachine gun
 chihuahua — small dog from Chihuahua, state of Mexico
 china — originally chinaware, as in "wares from China"
 Chinese wall, artificial organizational barrier, derived from Great Wall of China
 coach — a type of carriage, ultimately from Hungarian kocsi (szekér) or "carriage of Kocs", where this vehicle was first made 
 Coldstream Guards — regiment founded at Coldstream in Scotland
 cologne — a perfume originating from Cologne, Germany.
 Corinthian order — one of the three orders of classical architecture, after Corinth in Greece
 Coventry (in the construction "Send to Coventry"): shunned by friends and family, after the treatment of Royalist prisoners during the English Civil War
 Damask — material, from Damascus
 denim — a coarse cotton fabric, from French serge de Nîmes, or "serge of Nîmes", where the cloth originated 
 derby — a stakes race limited to three-year-old steeds, named after Derby in England by way of its 12th Earl; also refers to a style of shoe and hat.
 dollar — a unit of currency, originally from the German taler, an abbreviation of Joachimstaler ("gulden of Joachimstal"), a coin minted (1519) from silver mined near Joachimsthal, Bohemia
 donnybrook — colloquial term for a brawl or fracas, derived from Donnybrook Fair, an annual horse fair in the Dublin suburb notorious for fighting and drunkenness 
 doolally or dolally — an adjective meaning "mad" or "eccentric" (e.g. "to go dolally"), ultimately named after Deolali, a hill station near Nashik in colonial India, referring to the apparent madness of men waiting to return to Britain after their tour of duty 
 duffel or duffle — heavy woollen cloth, hence duffel coat and duffel bag; after Duffel, a town in Belgium where it was first made 
 Dunkirk spirit, after the evacuation of Dunkirk in World War II
 Estrela Mountain Dog — Estrela Mountains, where this dog breed is originally from
 Fez, (also called tarboosh), a hat — Fez, a city in Morocco
 Finlandization, the influence a large country can have on a smaller one, after Finland
 gamboge, a yellow artist's pigment — Cambodge, French name for Cambodia
 geyser, a hot water spring — Geysir in Iceland
 Glasgow kiss, a slang term meaning headbutt — Glasgow, Scotland
 Greek, not understandable ("all Greek to me") — Greek language of Greece
 Guinea, former British gold coin, and guineafowl — Guinea region of West Africa
 Gypsies, nomadic peoples in Europe and United States — Egypt
 Habanera — a musical style named after Havana, Cuba
 Hackney carriage, name for the London taxicab, probably from Hackney in London, England
 Havana, cigar — from capital of Cuba
 Hempenstall, a surname, after the town of Heptonstall (England)
 Honiton, a form of lace, after the town in Devon (England) where it is produced
 Holland, cotton or linen fabric — Holland
 iliad — a long narrative poem, or a series of woes, trials, etc.; both derive from the Homeric epic Iliad, literally meaning "of Ilium" (or Troy)
 Indian, the aboriginal peoples of the New World, after India
 Indigo, colour, after India
 Ionic order — one of the three orders of classical architecture, after Ionia in present-day Turkey
 japanning, application of lacquer, after Japan
 Jeans, denim trousers; Genoa
 Jersey cattle (also tomato, milk, cream, jumper) — Jersey, one of the Channel Islands
 Kimblewick bit, used on horses for riding — Kimble Wick, hamlet in Buckinghamshire (England)
 Labyrinth, maze, after a legendary structure on Crete
 Laconic, (of a person, speech, or style of writing) using very few words. From Laconia Ancient Sparta (Greece)
 Left Bank, style of life, fashion, or "look" — "Left Bank", left bank of the Seine (facing downstream) in Paris
 Leghorn chicken — after Leghorn, historical name for Livorno, Italy
 Lesbian, female homosexual — Lesbos, island in Greece
 Lipizzaner, a breed of horse — Lipica, town in Slovenia
 Magenta, colour — named after Magenta, Lombardy, Italy
 Marathon, long race — Marathon, Greece, town
 Madras, lightweight cotton fabric — Madras, old name for Chennai, coastal city in southeastern India
 Manila envelopes, Manila fiber — Manila, city in Philippines
 Marseillaise, national anthem of France — Marseille, city in France
 Masada, a mass suicide when conditions are hopeless, after Masada, Israel
 Mausoleum, a large and impressive tomb — Mausoleum at Halicarnassus in Turkey
 meander, a bend in a river — Meander, a river in Turkey
 Mecca, ultimate destination or activity center — Mecca, holy city in Saudi Arabia
 Mongoloid race — Mongolia, country in central Asia
 Morocco leather — Morocco, country in north Africa
 Muslin, a lightweight fabric — Mosul, Iraq
 Neanderthal man, known by his fossils — Neanderthal, Germany, valley where the fossils were found
 Nicene Creed, Christian doctrine — Nicaea, old name for İznik in Turkey
 Olympics, worldwide games — Mount Olympus, tallest mountain in Greece
 Ottoman (furniture), a type of stool — after the Ottoman Empire
 Paisley (design), used in shawls — Paisley, Scotland
 Panama hat — Panama in Central America, where it was first sold
 Portland cement — named after the Isle of Portland, England
 Rubicon, the point of no return — Rubicon (or Rubico), a small former river in northern Italy
 Rhode Island Red — Chicken named after Rhode Island
 Rugby football — Rugby School, in Rugby, Warwickshire, central England
 Shanghaied — drugged and forced into service aboard a ship, from Shanghai, China
 Siamese twins, conjoined twins — Siam, old name for Thailand
 Siberia, a remote undesirable location — Siberia, in eastern Russia
 Skid Row, originally Skid Road of Seattle, now the rundown area of a U.S. city
 Sodomy, forbidden sexual acts — Sodom, Biblical town on the plain of the Dead Sea
 Solecism, incorrect or ungrammatical usage of language — Soli an ancient city in Cilicia, where a dialect of Greek regarded as substandard was spoken
 Spa, place having water with health-giving properties — Spa, a town in Belgium, also famous for its motor racing circuit.
 Suede, a durable fabric — French name for Sweden
 Surrey, horse-drawn carriage — Surrey, a county in southern England
 Timbuktu, metaphor for an exotic, distant land — Timbuktu, city on the Niger River in Mali, West Africa
 Trojan horse, malicious computer virus — Trojan Horse, of Troy, from the Iliad
 turkey, from Turkey
 tuxedo, after Tuxedo Park, New York
 Vaudeville, after the Vau de Vire the setting for the bawdy songs of Olivier Basselin.
 volcano, from Italian island of Vulcano
 Xanadu, a symbol of opulence — Xanadu (or Shangdu), summer capital of Kublai Khan's empire

Events and agreements 
 Abu Ghraib (Iraq) – the Abu Ghraib torture and prisoner abuse scandal in 2003
 Arraiolos — Arraiolos Group
 Attica (New York) – the Attica Prison riots in 1971
 Beijing (China) – the Fourth World Conference on Women in 1994
 Brest (Belarus) – the Treaty of Brest-Litovsk in 1918
 Bretton Woods (New Hampshire) – The Bretton Woods system from 1944
 Cairo (Egypt) – the International Conference on Population and Development of 1994
 Camp David (U.S. presidential retreat in Maryland) – the Camp David Accords of 1978 and the Camp David 2000 Summit
 Copenhagen (Denmark) – the World Summit for Social Development in 1995
 Dayton (Ohio) – the Dayton Peace Agreement in 1995
 Doha (Qatar) – the Doha round of World Trade Organization negotiations that began in 2001
 Durban (South Africa) – the World Conference against Racism in 2001
 Geneva (Switzerland) – the Geneva Conventions, and the unofficial Geneva Accord negotiations of 2003
 Gleneagles (Scotland) – the 31st G8 summit in Gleneagles, Scotland
 Grand Trianon (a château in France) – the Treaty of Trianon in 1919
 Hillsborough (Sheffield, England) – the Hillsborough disaster of 1989
 Hiroshima (Japan) – the atomic bombing of Hiroshima in 1945
 Jackson State (Mississippi) – the Jackson State killings in 1970
 Kent State (Ohio) – the Kent State shootings in 1970
 Kyoto (Japan) – the Kyoto Protocol of 1997
 Lisbon — the Tresty of Lisbon of 2007 
 Locarno (Switzerland) – the Locarno Treaties of 1925
 Lockerbie (Scotland) – the Lockerbie bombing of 1988
 Maastricht (The Netherlands) – the Maastricht Treaty of 1992
 Marrakesh (Morocco) – the Marrakesh Agreement of 1994 establishing the World Trade Organization
 Munich (Germany) – the Munich Agreement of 1938 and the Munich Massacre at the 1972 Summer Olympics
 Nantes – the Edict of Nantes in 1598
 My Lai (Vietnam) – the My Lai Massacre of 1968
 Nuremberg (Germany) – the Nuremberg Trials of 1945 to 1949
 Oslo (Norway) – the Oslo Accords of 1993
 Portsmouth (New Hampshire) – the Treaty of Portsmouth in 1905 (not Portsmouth, England)
 Potsdam (Germany) – the Potsdam Conference in 1945
 Pugwash (Canada) – the Pugwash Conferences
 Rio de Janeiro (Brazil) – site of the Earth Summit, officially the United Nations Conference on Environment and Development (UNCED) of 1992
 Saint-Germain-en-Laye (a château in France) – the Treaty of Saint-Germain-en-Laye in 1919
 San Stefano (now Yeşilköy, Turkey) – the Treaty of San Stefano in 1878
 Schengen (Luxembourg) – the Schengen treaty of 1985
 Seattle (Washington) – the WTO Meeting of 1999 in Seattle
 Tordesillas (Spain) – the Treaty of Tordesillas in 1494
 Trafalgar (a headland in Spain) – the Battle of Trafalgar in 1805
 Uruguay – the Uruguay Round of trade negotiations from 1986 to 1994 that transformed the General Agreement on Tariffs and Trade (GATT) into the World Trade Organization (WTO)
 Versailles (France) – the Treaty of Versailles in 1919
 Yalta (Ukraine) – the Yalta Conference in 1945
 Warsaw (Poland) – the Warsaw Pact (1955–1991)
 Waterloo (Belgium) – the Battle of Waterloo in 1815
 Watergate (office building in Washington, D.C.) – the Watergate scandal of 1972 to 1975
 Woodstock (New York) – the Woodstock Festival in 1969
 Worms – the Concordat of Worms in 1122

Industries and professions 
 Bay Street — Canada's financial industry (similar to Wall Street), after Bay Street, the main street of Toronto's financial district
 Beltway — the pundits, political leaders, and opinion-makers of Washington, D.C., after the highway surrounding the city
 Broadway — musical theater, after Broadway, a street in New York City
 The City — London-based financial services, after the City of London
 Detroit — the American automobile industry
 Fleet Street — the British press, after the London street that formerly housed many newspapers
 Hollywood — the American motion picture industry, after the district of Los Angeles, California, where many motion picture companies are headquartered
 K Street — lobbying industry working with the U.S. Federal government
 Madison Avenue — advertising industry, after Madison Avenue, a street in New York City where many advertising firms are headquartered
 Savile Row — tailoring, after the street in London where the most prestigious tailors are located
 Wall Street — U.S. financial services industry, after Wall Street, street in New York City where many financial services firms are headquartered

Food and drink (other than cheese and wine) 

 Anjou pear — Anjou
 Arbroath smokie (a kind of smoked haddock) — Arbroath in Scotland
 Bakewell Pudding — chicken in Derbyshire, England
 Bath bun — Bath, England
 Bath Oliver (biscuit) — Bath, England
 Berliner (pastry), named after Berlin
 Black Forest gateau, Black Forest cake, Schwarzwälder Kirschtorte — Black Forest (Schwarzwald), Germany
 Bolognese sauce — from Bologna, Italy
 Bombay duck, a kind of fish — Bombay, old name for Mumbai, coastal city in western India
 Brazil nut
 Brussels sprout — after the capital of Belgium
 Buffalo wings, named for Buffalo, New York, where they originated
 Cantaloupe (also called rockmelon), a variety of melon — Cantalupo, multiple communes in Italy
 Ceylon tea — from Ceylon, old name for Sri Lanka
 Chelsea bun — Chelsea in London, England
 Cognac
 Coney Island hot dog — named after Coney Island, New York, but apparently invented in the Midwest of the United States
 Cuban, sub sandwich in Florida — Cuba, country in the Caribbean
 Curaçao liqueur — Curaçao
 Currant, a dried raisin — Corinth in Greece
 Danish, a sweet pastry — (in Denmark it is called wienerbrød, "bread from Vienna")
 Darjeeling tea — Darjeeling in India
 Dijon, mustard named after the French city
 Dover sole — from Dover, England
 Dublin Bay prawn — from Dublin, Ireland
 Eccles cake — from Eccles, Greater Manchester, England
 Glamorgan sausage a vegetarian sausage, Glamorgan county, Wales -
 Frankfurter (or Wiener — from Vienna)
 Hamburger — Hamburg, Germany
 Hollandaise sauce — Holland
 Jaffa orange — Jaffa
 Jaffa Cakes
 Java, slang for coffee — from island in Indonesia
 Jerusalem artichoke — wrongly associated with Jerusalem
 Kiwifruit — from Kiwi, the national symbol of and a nickname for New Zealand
 Lancashire hotpot — from Lancashire, England
 Lemon & Paeroa — from mineral water springs at the New Zealand town of Paeroa
 Madeira cake — Madeira Islands
 Manhattan cocktail — Manhattan Club in New York City
 Martini — Martinez, California, where the precursor to the martini, the Martinez, was developed
 Mayonnaise — from Mahón, Menorca, Spain
 Mocha coffee, ice cream — Mocha, Yemen, place where the coffee is grown
 Peach — from Persia, old name for Iran
 Peking Duck, a Chinese dish made of duck — Peking, old name for Beijing, China
 Pilsner lager — Plzeň, Czech Republic
 Pomfret Cakes — from Pontefract, Yorkshire, England
 Salisbury steak — Salisbury, England
 Sardine, types of small fish — Sardinia, island in the Mediterranean near Italy
 Seltzer (commercial name), Selters, Germany
 Seville orange — Seville
 Shallot — Ashkelon
 Swede (vegetable) — Sweden; also known as Swedish turnip
 Tabasco sauce — Tabasco, state of Mexico
 Tangerine — from Tangier in Morocco
 Turkish delight — Turkey
 Valencia orange — Valencia, Spain
 Welsh rarebit — A cheese and herb sauce drizzled over hot bread or toast; probably originating from Welsh peasants
 Vichyssoise — Chilled leek and potato soup, named for Vichy, France
 Virginia peanut — Virginia
 Yorkshire puddings from Yorkshire

Note: Saskatoon, Saskatchewan is named after the local Saskatoon berry, rather than vice versa.

Cheese 

 Ackawi
 American cheese, a common name for processed cheese
 Asiago after Asiago, the plateau and town in northern Italy where it was first made
 Brie after the Brie region in Île de France, where it was first made
 Caerphilly after Caerphilly, a town in Wales
 Camembert (cheese) chicken  Camembert, Orne in France
 Cheddar after Cheddar in Somerset, England, where it was originally made
 Cheshire after Cheshire, a county in England
 Colby after Colby, Wisconsin, where it was first made
 Danbo cheese after Denmark
 Derby cheese after Derbyshire a county in central England
 Dubliner after Dublin, Ireland
 Dunlop after the town of Dunlop in Ayrshire, Scotland
 Edam after town of Edam in the Netherlands
 Emmental after Emmental, the name of a valley in Switzerland where it was originally made
 Double Gloucester cheese after Gloucester cattle, originally from Gloucester in England
 Gorgonzola after Gorgonzola, a village in northern Italy
 Gouda after the city Gouda in the Netherlands where originally made
 Gruyère after Gruyère, a district in Switzerland where first made
 Jarlsberg after the town Jarlsberg in Norway
 Lancashire cheese after Lancashire in England
 Lappi after Lapland region of Finland
 Leicester cheese after Leicester in England
 Limburger after Limburg, a former duchy of Lorraine
 Manchego after La Mancha, Spain
 Molbo, from the Mols peninsula in Jutland, Denmark
 Monterey Jack, from Monterey, California (not Monterrey, Mexico)
 Morbier
 Munster after town Munster, Haut-Rhin in Alsace region of France
 Nablusi
 Neufchâtel, from Neufchâtel-en-Bray, the part of Normandie where it originates
 Oaxaca, after Oaxaca de Juárez, a state and city in Mexico
 Parmesan, from Parma, Italy
 Roma(no) after Rome, Italy
 Roquefort after a village in southern France
 Samsø after the island of Samsø in Denmark
 Stilton after Stilton, a village in England where it was first sold
 Swiss after Switzerland
 Tilsit after a town in East Prussia (now Sovetsk, Russia) where it was first produced
 Wensleydale cheese after Wensleydale in North Yorkshire, England

Wine 
 Alsace
 Asti — Asti (province), Italy
 Beaujolais
 Bordeaux
 Burgundy
 Chablis
 Champagne, a sparkling wine named after the region of France where it is produced
 Chardonnay
 Gamay
 Hock, indirectly from Hochheim in Germany
 Madeira wine, a fortified wine and Plum in madeira, a dessert — Madeira islands of Portugal
 Marsala wine, a dry or sweet wine — Marsala, a town in western Sicily
 Port wine (or Porto), sweet fortified wine — Porto, in northern Portugal
 Rioja — La Rioja (region), Spain
 Sherry wine, an anglicisation of Jerez — Jerez de la Frontera, a city in southern Spain
 Tokaji, white wine — a city in Hungary

Corporations 
There are some corporations whose name is simply the same as their original location.
 Évian
 Iittala
 Nokia
 Raisio
 Tikkurila
 Vaasa
 Vauxhall

Elements 
See: Chemical elements named after places

Musical genres 
Britpop — British popular music
Canterbury scene — after Canterbury, Kent, England
Chicago soul — after Chicago
Dixieland jazz — after Dixie, nickname for the southern United States
Dunedin sound — after the New Zealand city of Dunedin
Madchester — after Manchester, England
Memphis soul — after Memphis, Tennessee
Northern soul — after Northern England
Merseybeat — after the River Mersey
Philly soul — after Philadelphia, Pennsylvania
Urban Pasifika — after the Pacific Ocean
Goa trance – after Goa

Derivations from literary or mythical places 
 Brobdingnagian, meaning very large in size — Brobdingnag, fictional land in the book Gulliver's Travels
 Cloud cuckoo land, an unrealistically idealistic state where everything is perfect, from The Birds by Aristophanes
 Eden, any paradisaical area, named after the religious Garden of Eden
 El Dorado, any area of great wealth, after the mythical city of gold
 hell, any horrible place, after the religious Hell
 Lilliputian, meaning very small in size — Lilliput, fictional island in the book Gulliver's Travels
 Munchkin, small children, dwarfs, or anything of diminutive stature — from the Munchkin country in The Wonderful Wizard of Oz
 Never Never Land, a metaphor for eternal childhood, immortality, and escapism, from J. M. Barries's Peter Pan
 Shangri-La, a mythical utopia, a language usage — Shangri-La, fictional place in the novel Lost Horizon
 utopia, term for organized society — Utopia, fictional republic from the book of the same name

See also 

 Lists of etymologies
 List of eponyms, names derived from people's names
 Demonym
 Lists of things named after places (chemical elements, chess openings, foods, drinks, mathematical problems, minor planets, other places, etc.)

References 

Toponymy
Toponyms